20,000 Leagues Under the Sea is a 1997 television film directed by Michael Anderson and starring Ben Cross as Captain Nemo.  It premiered on March 23, 1997. Based on the 1870 novel of the same name by Jules Verne, it is most notable for replacing the character of Professor Aronnax's manservant, Conseil, with the Professor's daughter, Sophie, who disguises herself as a boy so that she may accompany her father aboard USS Abraham Lincoln; she becomes the apex of a love triangle involving Captain Nemo and Ned the harpooner. The film was produced by Hallmark Entertainment.

Cast and characters
 Richard Crenna as Professor Aronnax
 Ben Cross as Captain Nemo
 Paul Gross as Ned Land
 Julie Cox as Sophie Aronnax
 Michael Jayston as Admiral John E. Sellings
 Jeff Harding as Captain Michael Farragut

External links
 

1990s American films
1997 television films
1997 films
American science fiction television films
Sonar Entertainment films
Television shows based on Twenty Thousand Leagues Under the Sea